WAY-181187 is a high affinity and selective 5-HT6 receptor full agonist. It induces robust increases in extracellular GABA levels in the frontal cortex, hippocampus, striatum, and amygdala of rats without affecting concentrations in the nucleus accumbens or thalamus, and has modest to no effects on norepinephrine, serotonin, dopamine, or glutamate levels in these areas. WAY-181187 has demonstrated preclinical efficacy in rodent models of depression, anxiety, and notably obsessive-compulsive disorder, though it has also been shown to impair cognition and memory.

See also 
 WAY-208466

References 

5-HT6 agonists
Experimental drugs
Serotonin receptor agonists